THG Fluently, formerly Language Connect, is a translation and language localisation service provided through THG Ingenuity. It provides a range of language services, including translation, interpreting, localisation, voice-overs, transcription, and multilingual search engine optimization.

History
The company was founded by Ben and Iwona Taylor as Language Connect in 2003 and targeted translation services to multinational companies. Based in London, it opened its first international operations in Munich in 2009 with subsequent branches opening in Melbourne (2009), New York City (2012), Istanbul (2012) and Singapore (2015).

In 2018, the company was acquired by THG plc for £12.7m. It was rebranded as THG Fluently and forms the translation service for THG Ingenuity, an e-commerce platform.

References

THG (company)
Translation companies
Companies based in the London Borough of Southwark
Service companies of the United Kingdom
Companies established in 2003
Translation software
Software companies established in 2003